The men's 4 × 100 metre freestyle relay competition of the swimming events at the 2012 European Aquatics Championships took place May 21. The heats and final took place on May 21.

Records
Prior to the competition, the existing world, European and championship records were as follows.

Results

Heats
10 nations participate in 2 heats.

Final
The final was held at 18:18.

References

Men's 4 x 100 metre freestyle relay